Titwala is a town near Kalyan in the Indian state of Maharashtra Located In Thane District. Titwala is famous for the Siddhivinayak Mahaganapati Temple (Titwala), wherein lakhs of devotees visit this temple during Ganesh Chaturthi and Angarki Sankashti Chaturthi.


Geography

[[File:Titwala dam.jpg|thumb|right|Titwala dam on Kalu river]

It is a very old river (info by Vivek RN barve )

Temples
 Siddhivinayak Mahaganapati Temple

It is the site of a temple of Ganesha and purportedly the hermitage where Shakuntala was born.

The Siddhivinayak Mahaganapati Temple is located at Titwala. The day of 'Angarki Sankashti Chaturthi', a holy day in the Hindu Calendar, attracts large crowds. Titwala attracts visitors from the suburbs of Mumbai. Believers claim that if Mahaganapati is worshiped regularly, marriages of those wanting to be united can be arranged and that conflicts between husband and wife can end and those that desire a son or daughter, will have one born to them.

References 

Cities and towns in Thane district